"Bonny Portmore" is an Irish traditional folk song which laments the demise of Ireland's old oak forests, specifically the Great Oak of Portmore or the Portmore Ornament Tree, which fell in a windstorm in 1760 and was subsequently used for shipbuilding and other purposes.

Background
In 1664 an extensive castle was erected at Portmore, near Portmore Lough, County Antrim by Lord Conway, on the site of a more ancient fortress. It contained accommodation for two troops of horse. The site fell into neglect after Conway's death in 1683, and the buildings removed around 1760. The old oak is believed to have stood on the estate of Portmore Castle.

The melody of this song was first published 1840 in Edward Bunting's Ancient Music of Ireland and was collected from the playing of Ulster harper Daniel Black in 1796. The tune is also known as "Margaret Lavin". The air is probably as old as the time of the O'Neill's of Ballinderry, who, due to declining fortunes were forced to sell the property to Lord Conway. The first verse appears to make reference to this sale.

A Scottish version laments the loss of a lover left behind at Portmore, which William Tait identifies with (St. Fillans). (There is also a Portmore Loch in the Scottish Borders). While attributed to Donald Cameron, Burns biographer Alan Cunningham believes it comes from the north of Ireland. Peter Buchan published a version which formed the basis of Burns' "My Heart's in the Highlands".

Lyrics
As with most folk songs, there are many variations. This is one version. The first verse can be used as a refrain, or repeated at the end.

O bonny Portmore, you shine where you stand
And the more I think on you the more I think long
If I had you now as I had once before
All the lords in Old England would not purchase Portmore.

O bonny Portmore, I am sorry to see
Such a woeful destruction of your ornament tree
For it stood on your shore for many's the long day
Till the long boats from Antrim came to float it away.

All the birds in the forest they bitterly weep
Saying, "Where shall we shelter or where shall we sleep?"
For the Oak and the Ash, they are all cutten down
And the walls of bonny Portmore are all down to the ground.

Notable recordings
Bert Jansch recorded a version on the album The Ornament Tree in 1990
Loreena McKennitt performed this song on her 1991 album The Visit, and it was subsequently used in the film Highlander III: The Sorcerer (1994). A new version of the song was recorded by Laura Creamer for the 1995 episode "Homeland" of Highlander: The Series. Laura Creamer's version was re-used in the episodes "Dramatic Licence" (1996), "Armageddon" (1997) and the series' final episode, "Not To Be" (1997).
In 2000 the song was used in the film Highlander: Endgame, this time recorded by Jennifer McNeil.
It was recorded by Gregorian for their album Masters of Chant Chapter II (2001).
Donegal singer Aoife recorded the song for her 2003 album The Turning Of The Tide.
Kate Crossan performed this song on her 2001 album Voice of the Celtic Heart with Oliver Schroer.
Lucinda Williams recorded this song for the album Rogue's Gallery: Pirate Ballads, Sea Songs, and Chanteys, produced by Hal Willner
The song was used also as credits song in the film Kill the Irishman.
Dan Gibson along with Michael Maxwel released the album Emerald Forest: A Celtic Sanctuary which contain an instrumental version of Bonny Portmore mixed with natural birds sound.
Canadian folk singer Eileen McGann recorded this song on her 1995 album Journeys.
Spanish orchestral group Ensemble XXI recorded this song for their album Retratos del Mar (Portraits of the Sea), by Eugenia Boix (2006).
"Bonny Portmore" was covered by Laura Marling and Jonathan Wilson for AMC's Revolutionary War drama Turn. The song played over the ending montage of Episode 105 "Epiphany" and will be available on the show's original soundtrack.
In 2014, The Rails (James Walbourne and Kami Thompson) released the album Fair Warning, on which their acoustic cover of "Bonnie Portmore" is the opening track.
Megan Walsh, a member of all-female Irish group Celtic Woman, covered the song on the group's 2021 album Postcards From Ireland.

References

Further reading
 Bartlett, Jon. Three-Quarter Times: The Newsletter of the Vancouver Folk Song Society, Vol XXIII, No. 8: 29 November 1993 and Vol XXIII, No. 4: 27 May 1998.

External links
 "Margaret Lavin" tune

Irish songs
Year of song unknown
Songwriter unknown